Swarbrick is a surname. Notable people with the surname include:

Politicians
Anne Swarbrick (born c. 1952), Canadian politician
Chlöe Swarbrick (born 1994), New Zealand politician

Sport
David Swarbrick (born 1927), English rugby player
George Swarbrick (born 1942), Canadian ice hockey player
George Swarbrick (footballer) (1930–2016), Australian rules footballer
James Swarbrick (1880–1970), English footballer
Matthew Swarbrick (born 1977), English cricketer
Neil Swarbrick (born 1965), association football referee

Other
Dave Swarbrick (1941–2016), English folk musician
Jack Swarbrick (born 1954), American lawyer and university administrator
Nicholas Swarbrick (1898–2006), oldest surviving English merchant sailor of the First World War
Paul Swarbrick (born 1958), Bishop of Lancaster
Thomas Swarbrick (c. 1675 – c. 1753), English organ builder

See also
Swarbrick Formation, a geologic formation in Nevada, United States
The Swarbriggs, Irish pop musicians
Swarbrick statistical area, a statistical area within Hamilton, New Zealand